Jay Peak can refer to

 Jay Peak Resort, an alpine skiing area located in Jay, Vermont, USA.

 Jay Peak (Vermont), a 1,176-m-high mountain in Jay, Vermont